Whole Lotta Sole (known as Stand Off in North America) is a 2012 independent criminal comedy film co-written and directed by Terry George and starring Brendan Fraser, David O'Hara, Colm Meaney, Yaya DaCosta and Martin McCann.

Plot 
Hoping to pay back some gambling debt he owes to local mobster Mad Dog Flynn (David O'Hara), Jim (Martin McCann) robs the local fishmongers, only to discover that it's actually a front for the mobster's business. Now on the run and pursued by police detective Weller (Colm Meaney), Jim is cornered in an antique shop where he takes hostage a collection of colourful characters, including American Joe Maguire (Brendan Fraser), the owner who may be his illegitimate father, and his girlfriend Sophie (Yaya DaCosta). Caught between the mobster's gang and the police, the unfortunate young Jim must find a way out of this tricky situation with help from his hostages.

Cast 
Brendan Fraser as Joe Maguire
David O'Hara as Mad Dog Flynn
Colm Meaney as Weller
Yaya DaCosta as Sophie
Martin McCann as Jim
Conor MacNeill as Sox
Emma Hamilton as Tracey Maguire
Michael Legge as Randy
Jonathan Harden as Pavis
Marie Jones as Ma Flynn
Rupert Wickham as Farnsworth
Amanda Girvan as Police Woman
Darran Watt as Police Man
Mary McCrossan as Annie
Amanda Hurwitz as Mary Ellen
Hugh McLaughlin as Clipper

Production 

Whole Lotta Sole was filmed in Downpatrick and Belfast, Northern Ireland. Filming began on 8 April 2011.

Release 
The film had its world premiere on Saturday 21 April 2012, in the Spotlight Series at the Tribeca Film Festival 2012, had its European premiere on Sunday 10 June 2012, at the Belfast Film Festival, was shown at the Traverse City Film Festival in Michigan in August 2012 and was shown at the Mill Valley, Hamptons International Film Festivals and Austin Film Festival in October 2012. The film has also been picked up for distribution in European, South African and Asian territories. The film, as Stand Off, was shown at the Mostly British Film Festival in San Francisco (22 January 2013) and was released in US theatres on 22 February 2013.

References

External links 

 
 
 Getty Images

2012 films
2010s crime comedy films
2012 independent films
British crime comedy films
British independent films
Irish crime comedy films
Irish independent films
Films about hostage takings
Films directed by Terry George
Films set in Belfast
Films shot in Northern Ireland
English-language Irish films
2010s English-language films
2010s British films